Bupivacaine/meloxicam, sold under the brand name Zynrelef, is a fixed-dose combination medication used to treat pain in small to medium-sized wounds after surgery. It contains bupivacaine and meloxicam.

The most common side effects of bupivacaine/meloxicam are dizziness, constipation, vomiting, and headache.

It was approved for medical use in the European Union in September 2020, and in the United States in May 2021.

Medical uses 
In the European Union, the combination bupivacaine/meloxicam is indicated for treatment of somatic postoperative pain from small- to medium-sized surgical wounds in adults.

In the United States it is indicated for soft tissue or periarticular instillation to produce postsurgical analgesia for up to 72 hours after bunionectomy, open inguinal herniorrhaphy, and total knee arthroplasty in adults.

References

External links 
 
 
 
 

Local anesthetics
Nonsteroidal anti-inflammatory drugs